The 2023 European Junior Judo Championships will be held at the Sportcampus Zuiderpark in The Hague, Netherlands, from 7 to 10 September 2023. The final day of the competition will feature a mixed-team event.

References

External links
 

European Junior Judo Championships
U21
European Championships, U21
Judo
Judo competitions in the Netherlands
Judo
Judo